The Morocco national badminton team represents Morocco in international badminton team competitions and is controlled by the Moroccan Royal Badminton Federation. The national team trains in the capital city of Casablanca. The Moroccan team participated in the Sudirman Cup in 1995 and 2001. 

The men's team reached the quarterfinals of the 2018 All Africa Men's and Women's Team Badminton Championships but lost the quarterfinal tie to Nigeria with a score of 0-3.

Participation in BWF competitions

Sudirman Cup

Participation in African Badminton Championships

Men's team

Women's team

Mixed team

Current squad 

Men
Imrane Bellamou
Driss Bourroum
Bilal El Harab
Anas Idlahoucine
Youssef Oubella

Women
Oumaima Elherz
Ghita Abdel Wahid
Jinane Bitarie
Ghita Charouite
Rajae Rochdy

References

Badminton
National badminton teams
Badminton in Morocco